WKOC-LP (103.1 FM) was a low power FM radio station formerly licensed to serve Ider, Alabama, United States. Owned by Ider Educational Broadcasting, it aired a Christian radio format. It received a portion of its programming as part of the Three Angels Broadcasting Network.

History
This station received its original construction permit from the Federal Communications Commission on June 18, 2003. It was assigned the call letters WKOC-LP by the FCC on September 17, 2004, and received its license to cover from the FCC on July 19, 2005. On December 2, 2011, the station's license was cancelled and its call sign deleted from the FCC's database per the licensee's request.

References

External links

KOC-LP
KOC-LP
DeKalb County, Alabama
Three Angels Broadcasting Network radio stations
Radio stations disestablished in 2011
Defunct radio stations in the United States
Defunct religious radio stations in the United States
KOC-LP
Radio stations established in 2003
2003 establishments in Alabama
2011 disestablishments in Alabama